Lynda Blutreich (née Lipson; born December 13, 1971, in Lynn, Massachusetts) is a three-time USATF champion javelin thrower from the United States.

She was on the college track team at the University of North Carolina, Chapel Hill.

She is also a photographer and member of Art of the Olympians (AOTO)

International competitions

References

1971 births
Living people
Track and field athletes from Massachusetts
Sportspeople from Lynn, Massachusetts
American female discus throwers
American female javelin throwers
Olympic track and field athletes of the United States
Athletes (track and field) at the 2000 Summer Olympics
Pan American Games track and field athletes for the United States
Athletes (track and field) at the 1995 Pan American Games
Athletes (track and field) at the 1999 Pan American Games
World Athletics Championships athletes for the United States
North Carolina Tar Heels women's track and field athletes
Competitors at the 1998 Goodwill Games